Hobucken is an unincorporated community and census-designated place (CDP) in Pamlico County, North Carolina, United States. Its population was 38 as of the 2020 census. Hobucken has a post office with ZIP code 28537. North Carolina Highway 33 and North Carolina Highway 304 pass through in the community.

Demographics

References

Census-designated places in North Carolina
Census-designated places in Pamlico County, North Carolina
Unincorporated communities in North Carolina
Unincorporated communities in Pamlico County, North Carolina